Rjavina is a mountain in Slovenian Julian Alps. Located between two Alpine glacial valleys, Kot and Krma, it offers nice views to some of the highest Slovenian peaks, including Triglav, Škrlatica and Rž.

References

External links 

Mountains of the Julian Alps
Two-thousanders of Slovenia